Colorado Field was an outdoor college football stadium in the western United States, on the campus of Colorado State University in Fort Collins, Colorado. Opened in 1912, it was the home of the CSU Rams of the Western Athletic Conference (WAC) through 1967.

Constructed entirely by the students and faculty  in 1912, Colorado Field was the first football field in the state of Colorado to have grass sod on the playing surface. Located at the corner of College Avenue and University Avenue, it was part of an athletic complex which included the field's cinder running track, an additional football practice field, a baseball field, volleyball courts, a basketball court, and a locker room facility. It replaced frequently muddy Durkee Field to the north, the site of the Glenn Morris Field House.

The Colorado Aggies won nine conference championships here between 1915 and 1955, with players such as Ralph "Sag" Robinson, Kenny Hyde, Julius Wagner, Thurman "Fum" McGraw, Jack Christiansen, Gary Glick, and Oscar Reed.

Lights were added in 1948 for night games, but demand grew for an updated and larger stadium; Colorado Field's last season was in 1967, replaced by Hughes Stadium in 1968. Torn down in 1972, it had a rebirth in 1986 as "Jack Christiansen Track," the home of the CSU track and field team.

Capacity
 1912–1920: 1,000 steel bleachers and temporary bleachers as needed
 1921–1924: 5,400 seat wooden grandstand and 2,000 temporary wooden bleachers
 1925–1929: 7,500 permanent seats
 1929–1947: 10,000 
 1948–1967: 14,000 maximum capacity with temporary bleachers in the end zones

References

Defunct college football venues
Colorado State Rams football
American football venues in Colorado
Sports venues demolished in 1972
Demolished sports venues in Colorado
Colorado State Rams baseball